The Krýsuvík fires were a period of volcanic activity in a fissure swarm known as Krýsuvík (:is: Krýsuvíkureldar) on the Reykjanes peninsula.

The fires started in the middle of the 12th century, probably in 1151 and written sources indicate that they ended in 1188. Lava flows associated with the Krýsuvík fires are Ögmundarhraun, Mávahlíðahraun  and Kapelluhraun .

See also
 List of volcanic eruptions on Iceland
 Krýsuvík (volcanic system)
 Volcanism of Iceland
 Geology of Iceland
 List of volcanoes in Iceland
 Geological deformation of Iceland
 Global Volcanism Program

References

External links
 Catalogue of Icelandic Volcanoes

Mountains of Iceland
Active volcanoes
One-thousanders of Iceland
Volcanic systems of Iceland
Krýsuvík Volcanic System
Reykjanes Volcanic Belt
Fissure vents
Southern Region (Iceland)